|}

The Silver Bowl Stakes is a flat handicap horse race in Great Britain open to three-year-olds. It is run at Haydock Park over a distance of 1 mile and 37 yards (1,643 metres), and it is scheduled to take place each year at the end of May.

Winners since 1988

See also
 Horse racing in Great Britain
 List of British flat horse races

References

Racing Post:

Flat races in Great Britain
Flat horse races for three-year-olds
Haydock Park Racecourse